O Phileleftheros (meaning "The Liberal") is the largest newspaper (by circulation) in Cyprus, with about 26,000 copies daily (2002). Established in 1955, it is also the oldest Greek-language daily newspaper in circulation on the island. Other daily newspapers published in Cyprus include Politis, Simerini, Haravgi, and Alithia.

Over the years, Phileleftheros has expanded into a publishing company and has released several magazines (including the Cyprus editions of Cosmopolitan and Top Gear), as well as recently launching its own radio station, Radio Sfera.

In a newspaper scene dominated by political parties, Phileleftheros gains a reputation of being independent and not under the influence of any particular political party. The paper's motto reads: "Ημερήσια Εφημερίδα στην Υπηρεσία του Κυπριακού Λαού", which translates into English as the "Daily newspaper serving the people of Cyprus".

History 
According to the article on the paper on page 239 of "Τόμος 13, Μεγάλη Κυπριακή Εγκυκλοπαίδεια, Πρώτη Έκδοση (1990)", the first issue of Phileleftheros came out on 7 December 1955. According to the same source, the paper published for many years on the first page the satirical verse of Anthos Rodinis.

For many years the Sunday edition included the weekly magazine "ΣΕΛΙΔΕΣ", while the Saturday issue started offering a TV magazine named "TVμανια". This tradition continues into 2014. The Sunday magazine was sometime replaced with DownTown, which continues to be given as one of the supplements in 2014. While the daily costs €1.20, the Saturday price is €2.50 and the Sunday issue is offered at the price of €3.50. Additional magazines are offered every Sunday.

See also 
Stephanos Constantinides, columnist
List of newspapers in Cyprus

References 

Newspapers established in 1955
Greek-language newspapers
Newspapers published in Cyprus
1955 establishments in Cyprus